CISL may mean:

 Confederazione Italiana Sindacati Lavoratori, the Italian Confederation of Workers' Trade Unions
 Continental Indoor Soccer League. An Indoor Soccer League 1993-1997
 CISL (AM), a radio station in Richmond, British Columbia.
The Cambridge Institute for Sustainability Leadership (CISL)
 Computational and Information Systems Laboratory, a division of  NCAR